Bähre or Baehre is a German-language surname. It may refer to:
Bo Kanda Lita Baehre (1999), German athlete
Harry Bähre (1941), former German footballer
Karl Bähre (1899–1960), German water polo player

References 

German-language surnames